Shahmirzad (Native Name شامرزا) is a city and capital of Shahmirzad District in Mehdishahr County, located in the north of Iran and on the southern slopes of the Alborz Mountains. The permanent population of the city was recorded as 7,273 people, 1,860 families in the 2006 census but increased to 8,882 by 2011. During the Summers, the city's population rises to up to 40,000 people, as tourists visit the city for its cool climate and popular gardens.

Shahmirzad has been home to people of diverse ethnic backgrounds, a large group of whom seasonally settled in cities and towns of Mazandaran, such as Babol, Sari, Neka, and Behshahr. During the past decades many Muslim, Bahá'í, and Shahmirzadi Jews,  migrated to larger cities in Iran and abroad, most notably San Francisco Bay Area.

Shahmirzadi language  (شامرزایی), is a Caspian language close to Mazandarani .

Shahmirzadi homeowners are given a proprietary interest in the walnut orchard in proportion to the amount of land they own in the village. Shahmirzad also produces mineral water "Tenab Shahmirzad".

Famous Shahmirzadis
Hossein Fathieh, Mine explorer and University founder in Shahmirzad
Zabihollah Safa, Iran scholar and professor at the University of Tehran (d. 1999)
Hají Ákhúnd, Apostle of Baháʼu'lláh, Hand of the Cause in the Bahá’í Faith
Salman Ghaffari, Iran's Ambassador to Vatican (1986–1990), researcher, religious author & lecturer
Reza Jafari, Researcher at North Carolina State University and President of Road Safety and Transportation Solutions, Inc. (RSTS, Inc.)
 XPINO  A famous rapper in Persian rap

References

Populated places in Mehdishahr County
Cities in Semnan Province